The Regent School is a British-style co-education school established to cater for children of British expatriate working in the city. It is located in Abuja, the federal capital territory of Nigeria. It was established in 2000.

History
The school started with the admission of primary school pupils from ages 2 to 11. Senior school opened in 2007.

Enrollment 
The school has 500 pupils in primary and 300 pupils in the secondary school. The secondary school offers a boarding facility with a day option. The school accepts school fees in US dollars.

House system
The house system is a way of facilitating relationships among the pupils and also to enhance their team and leadership spirit. Each house is coordinated by a prefect. The house system operates on unit bases. The maximum points that can be earned are 25 units. Certificates and badges are the rewards for good behaviour. Houses are named after African rivers. The four houses in the school are:

Red House :Zambezi
Blue House :Nile
Yellow House :Limpopo
Green House :Niger

Curriculum
As a British styled school, it offers the following curriculum:
National Curriculum for England and Wales in year 7 and 8.
CIE Checkpoint in Year 9 
CIE IGCSE in Year 10 and 11

Alumni
The Regent School established The Alumni as a way of developing relationships among the pupils that have left the school and those that are still in the school.

Parent-teacher association
This is a group of volunteer parents who contribute money towards the community. PTA links the parents and teachers to discuss ways of developing the school.

References

External links
 Official website

Secondary schools in the Federal Capital Territory (Nigeria)